Gary Ablett may refer to:

 Gary Ablett Sr. (born 1961), Australian rules footballer, father of Ablett Jr.
 Gary Ablett Jr. (born 1984), Australian rules footballer, son of Ablett Sr.
 Gary Ablett (English footballer) (1965–2012), association footballer

See also
Ablett family
Ablett